Uetliberg TV-tower is a  freestanding concrete TV-Tower on Uetliberg, near Zürich, Switzerland, built in 1990. The tower is used for radio and TV transmission. It is owned by Swisscom and generally not accessible to the public.

External links 

   

 Introduction to the Uetliberg and Felsenegg tower 
http://www.skyscraperpage.com/diagrams/?b2365

Towers in Switzerland
Buildings and structures in the canton of Zürich
1990 establishments in Switzerland